The S-class was a class of 18 trams built by Duncan & Fraser, Adelaide for the Melbourne, Brunswick & Coburg Tramway Trust (MBCTT). The first 12 entered service numbered 1-12. All passed to the Melbourne & Metropolitan Tramways Board (MMTB) on 2 February 1920 when it took over the MBCTT becoming the S-class and renumbered 154-165. The other six were delivered directly to the MMTB as 166-171.

In 1941/42, 14 were rebuilt for one-man operation, seven for the isolated Footscray network and seven for all night services on the main network. The Footscray cars were returned to crewed configuration in 1947.

Preservation
One has been preserved:
164 as part of the VicTrack heritage fleet at Hawthorn depot

References

Melbourne tram vehicles
600 V DC multiple units